Meet the Applegates (released in the Philippines and the United States as The Applegates) is a 1990 American science fiction horror black comedy film directed by Michael Lehmann. It was filmed during 1988-89, but not released in the United States until 1991 due to the financial difficulties surrounding New World Pictures, the film's production company. It takes a dark, satirical look at the end of the world, nuclear holocausts, alienism and terrorism. It was filmed in Oshkosh, Appleton and Neenah, Wisconsin. It has gained a cult following.

Plot
The film opens in a forest with a family being attacked by a family of huge shapeshifting mutant bug creatures called, "Brazilian Cocorada". It then moves to a typical-looking family called the Applegates moving into a well-off suburban Ohio neighborhood. It is revealed that the Applegates are secretly exploring human society on a mission to eradicate the humans.

They are tasked with assimilating into the human culture. The Applegates have moved to the suburbs after the husband, Dick, got a job at a nuclear power plant. It is revealed that Dick is secretly working on a plan to cause a nuclear explosion that will rid the world of humans and leave the bugs in peace.

The Applegates start off living the All American dream. Dick is the patriarch loving father and major bread earner, while Jane is his loving wife and mother to "Johnny" and Sally. Johnny is initially a strait-laced A student but begins listening to heavy metal and becomes a pot-head. Sally starts out as the all American stereotype high school girl dating Vince Samson who is captain of the football team.

Dick and Jane's "perfect" marriage begins to crumble as they drift from each other. Dick begins having an affair at work and Jane becomes addicted to shopping and credit cards. While Johnny begins smoking marijuana with his metalhead buddies, Johnny accidentally displays his true bug form. In a panic, he cocoons his friends and hides them. Sally, while being raped by Vince, displays her true form. Also in a panic, she cocoons him and hides him in the basement. As they drift away from normality and their mission, their aunt, Bea, is dispatched to get the family back on track with their mission.

Chaos ensues when Dick's affair with his secretary leads to them both getting fired and his lover deciding to blackmail him. Dick in panic cocoons her and hides her in his basement. Jane is then accosted by two representatives from the credit card company for failure to pay her mounting card bills and she cocoons the men and hides them away. Jane panics and in an effort to pay off her debts tries to rob a local convenience store but is caught by the sheriff while fleeing the scene. With no other options she cocoons the sheriff and returns to the family house. Johnny walks in on her hiding the sheriff.

Sally enters and is revealed to be a lesbian, having become disillusioned with men after her interaction with Vince. The Applegates go into freefall when Jane's spending results in their possessions being repossessed. In a twist, just as they are at their lowest, a journalist and photographer enter to notify them that they have won a prize for being the most normal American family. However, after spotting Sally's pregnancy they attempt to rescind the prize.  In the struggle the journalist pushes Sally over, which induces labour.  She gives birth to a large insect egg, which rolls towards the journalist.  Disgusted, he stomps on it and kills it. They are quickly cocooned and hidden away.

Bea arrives and is shocked at the Applegates status. He then attempts to forge ahead with the mission but after the family realize they have grown to like living amongst the humans they decide they must prevent Bea from completing the mission. Dick intervenes and in the struggle he kills Bea, preventing the nuclear explosion. They save the town and humans.

At the end of the movie they return to their lives in Brazil and are visited by the townspeople that grew to love them. Although the plant did not blow up, enough radiation was released to remove the hair from much of the town's population.

A scene before the credits reveals that Aunt Bea survived and still intends to destroy the world.

Cast
Ed Begley Jr. as Richard Peter "Dick" Applegate
Stockard Channing as Jane Applegate
Dabney Coleman as Aunt Bea Cocorada/Ralph Carpenter
Robert Jayne as John Richard "Johnny" Applegate
Camille Cooper as Sally Applegate
Glenn Shadix as Gregory "Greg" Samson
Adam Biesk as Vince Sampson
Susan Barnes as Opal Withers
Roger Aaron Brown as Sheriff Heidegger
Lee Garlington as Nita Samson

Release
Meet the Applegates was released in the Philippines by First Films as The Applegates on June 6, 1990, with "[f]ree cassette tapes to lucky patrons." Meet the Applegates was released in the United States by Triton Pictures on February 1, 1991.

Critical response
On review aggregator website Rotten Tomatoes the film has a score of 10% based on reviews from 10 critics, with an average rating of 4.2/10.

The film was met with mixed reception.

References

External links

1990s comedy horror films
American black comedy films
American comedy horror films
1990s English-language films
Fictional families
Films about insects
Films about shapeshifting
Films directed by Michael Lehmann
Films produced by Denise Di Novi
Films scored by David Newman
Films set in Ohio
Films shot in Wisconsin
New World Pictures films
American pregnancy films
1990 comedy films
1990s American films